Amos is both a given name and a surname. It may refer to:

Given name

People
 Amos Bronson Alcott (1799–1888), American educator, father of American novelist Louisa May Alcott
 Amos Dolbear (1837–1910), American inventor
 Amos Eiran, Israeli President of the University of Haifa
 Amos Frishman (born 1964), Israeli basketball player 
 Amos Frumkin (born 1953), Israeli geologist
 Amos Gilad (1941–2010), Israeli Olympic runner
 Amos Grodzinowsky (born 1940), Israeli Olympic runner
 Amos Grunebaum (born 1950), obstetrician and gynecologist
 Amos Horev (born 1924), Israeli Major-General, nuclear scientist, and President of Technion – Israel Institute of Technology
 Amos E. Joel Jr. (1918–2008), American electrical engineer and inventor
 Amos Kairuz, birth name of Danny Thomas (1912–1991), American nightclub comedian and television and film actor and producer
 Amos Lapidot (1934–2019), Israeli fighter pilot, 10th commander of the Israeli Air Force, and President of Technion – Israel Institute of Technology
 Amos Lee (born 1978), American singer-songwriter
 Amos Magee (born 1971), American soccer player, coach, and front office
 Amos Mansdorf (born 1965), Israeli tennis player
 Amos Meller (1938–2007), Israeli composer and conductor
 Amos Miller (c. 1865–1888), lynching victim
 Amos O'Neal, American politician
 Amos Oz (born 1939), Israeli writer, novelist, and journalist 
 Amos Shapira, Israeli former president of El Al Airlines, Cellcom, and the University of Haifa
 Amos Urban Shirk (1890?–1956), American businessman, author and reader of encyclopedias
 Amos Singletary (1721–1806), American mill operator, lawyer, Anti-Federalist
 Amos Tversky (1937–1996), Israeli pioneer of cognitive science
 Amos Zereoué (born 1976), American football player
 Amos Gitai (born 1950), Israeli film director
 Amos Yadlin (born 1951), former Israeli Air Force general
 Amos Yarkoni (1920–1991), Arab Israeli officer in the Israel Defense Forces
 Amos Yee (born 1998), Singaporean convicted sex offender and former blogger, YouTuber and child actor.

Religious figures
 Amos (prophet), one of the twelve minor prophets in the Hebrew Bible
 Amos, son of Nephi and his son Amos, son of Amos, two minor figures in the Book of Mormon
 Amos, son of Nahum, mentioned briefly in the Gospel of Luke

Fictional characters
 Amos Burke, title character of Burke's Law, a 1960s American television series
 Amos Diggory, fictional character in the Harry Potter books and films
 Amos Jones, a title character of Amos 'n' Andy, an American radio show from the 1920s to the 1950s
 Amos Tupper, the original sheriff on the 1980s American TV series Murder, She Wrote
 Amos Slade, fictional character in The Fox and the Hound

Nickname
 Amos Martin (born 1949), American former National Football League player

Surname
 Alf Amos (1893–1959), English footballer
 Ben Amos (born 1990), English football goalkeeper
 Bruce Amos (born 1946), Canadian chess player
 Dan Amos (born 1951), chief executive officer of insurer Aflac
 Danny Amos (born 1987), South African born-Israeli association football player
 Emma Amos (disambiguation), multiple people
 Hallam Amos (born 1994), Welsh rugby player
 James F. Amos (born 1946), United States Marine Corps general
 Janet Amos, Canadian actress, director, educator and playwright
 John Amos (born 1939), American actor
 Lowell Amos (1943–2022), American murderer
 Luke Amos (born 1997), English footballer
 Martin John Amos (born 1941), American Catholic Bishop
 Michael Amos (20th century), New Zealand swimmer
 Nathan Amos (born 1979), South African born-Israeli international rugby union player
 Ruth Amos (born 1989), British entrepreneur and inventor
 Stephen K. Amos (born 1967), English stand-up comedian
 Terri Utley née Amos (born 1962), American beauty queen and motivational speaker
 Tori Amos (born Myra Ellen Amos, 1963), American pianist and singer-songwriter
 Wally Amos (born 1936), American entrepreneur, actor and book writer
 Walter Amos (1899–1967), English footballer
 Valerie Amos (born 1954), British peer

English-language surnames
Hebrew masculine given names